The Etruscans, like the contemporary cultures of Ancient Greece and Ancient Rome had a persistent military tradition. In addition to marking the rank and power of certain individuals in Etruscan culture, warfare was a considerable economic boon to Etruscan civilization. Like many ancient societies, the Etruscans conducted campaigns during summer months; raiding neighboring areas, attempting to gain territory and combating piracy as a means of acquiring valuable resources such as land, prestige goods and slaves. It is also likely individuals taken in battle would be ransomed back to their families and clans at high cost. Prisoners could also potentially be sacrificed on tombs to honor fallen leaders of Etruscan society, not unlike the sacrifices made by Achilles for Patroclus.

Significant battles 

The written record of the period of Etruscan is fragmentary but it is generally believed that the Etruscans vied with the early Romans for control of the central Italian peninsula for nearly two centuries (c. 700 B.C. – c. 500 B.C.) before becoming one of the first neighboring cultures to succumb to Roman expansion.

In the Battle of Cumae (474 B.C.), the Etruscans and allies were defeated in the waters off Cumae by the combined navies of Cumae and Syracuse. This defeat successfully blocked the southern expansion of Etruscan influence and marked the beginning of territorial loss in southern Italy.

In the Roman–Etruscan Wars, Roman authors wrote accounts of a drawn out siege on the city of Veii. According to the Roces, the army of Rome unsuccessfully laid siege to the Etruscan city of Veii for 9 years before they were able to tunnel beneath the walls of the city and bring about Veii's downfall. The veracity of the account is difficult to determine, because the accounts are told as part of the biography of Marcus Furius Camillus, a legendary figure in Roman history. Livy and Plutarch wrote about Camillus long after his death.

Equipment 

In addition to written sources, the archaeological record provides evidence for the Etruscan military and warfare. Tombs of wealthy Etruscans consistently contain either representative sculpture of weaponry and armour, or the items themselves. The varieties of shields, helms, armour and weaponry vary according to date and location, but can still be organized into broad stylistic categories.

Several Etruscan shields have been recovered from Etruscan grave sites. The shields are traditionally decorated bronze circular disks measuring around a yard across. Earlier Etruscan shields are flat and later examples have a slightly convex curve across the body of the shield. The later styles bear close resemblance to contemporary Greek models. There are several helmet designs found at Etruscan sites, the most distinctively Etruscan being the so-called “crested helm” variety. The crest is fashioned by joining two embossed plates (or laminae) into a high peak pointed crest. The high crest is frequently embossed with decoration. In addition to the Crested Helm a number of other varieties of helms have been found in Etruscan tombs. Often the design is a semi-spherical cap, with no decoration or with appliques. Another variation to the common semispherical cap is cheek guards attached by hinges.

Both swords and spears are frequently found at Etruscan tomb sites. Few examples of Etruscan swords survive in good condition, often only fragments of heavily oxidized blades. What does survive are generally robust spear points and wide blades not unlike early Roman weaponry. The bronze armour of the Etruscans is similar in style to that of the Greeks. One example from Tarquinia was two solid pieces connected by hinges at the hips and on either side of the neck. The example was anatomical in design, meaning the bronze plates were fashioned to look like the chest and back of a robust man. Another example from the Narce Tombs, northwest of the city of Rome, was from an earlier date and decorated like the Crested Helm. The Narce Tomb breast plate evidently would have restricted the range of motion considerable more and has led to hypotheses that it was intended for a stationary commander. Anatomical greaves have also been found in Etruscan tombs.

Some of what is known about the arms and armour of the Etruscans is not based on actual equipment but rather sculpted duplicates. "The Tomb of Reliefs" at Cerveteri is a rock-hewn tomb with relief and stucco relief work painted to look as if the dead would be provided with all necessary goods to live comfortably in the tomb. This tomb provides a great deal of beneficial insight to the several types of Etruscan material culture including weapons. Among the decorations were a number of life sized weapons, items of armour and shields.

References and further reading
 B. D'Agostino, 'Military Organisation and Social Structure in Archaic Etruria' in O. Murray & S. Price (eds), The Greek City: From Homer to Alexander (Oxford 1990), 58-82
 Peter Connolly, Greece and Rome at War (London, rev. ed. 2006), 91-100
 Ross Cowan, Roman Conquests: Italy (Barnsley 2009)
 Ross Cowan, 'The Art of the Etruscan Armourer' in Jean MacIntosh Turfa (ed.) The Etruscan World (London & New York 2013), 747-748
 Ross Cowan, 'Etruscan and Gallic Pila', Ancient Warfare 12.6 (2019), 18-21
 David George, 'Technology, Ideology, Warfare and the Etruscans Before the Roman Conquest' in Jean MacIntosh Turfa (ed.) The Etruscan World (London & New York 2013), 738-746
 W.V. Harris, Rome in Etruria and Umbria (Oxford 1971)
 L. Rawlings, 'Condottieri and Clansmen: Early Italian Raiding, Warfare and the State' in K. Hopwood (ed.), Organised Crime in Antiquity (Cardiff 1999), 97-127
 P. Stary, 'Foreign Elements in Etruscan Arms and Armour: 8th to 3rd Centuries BC', Proceedings of the Prehistoric Society 45 (1979), 179-206
 Jean MacIntosh Turfa, Catalogue of the Etruscan Gallery of the University of Pennsylvania Museum of Archaeology and Anthropology (Philadelphia 2005)
 Various authors, 'Warfare' in M. Torelli (ed.), The Etruscans (New York 2001), 558-565

External links 
 Dan Diffendale, Etruscan and Umbrian arms and armour
 Ross Cowan, Etruscan and Gallic Pila
 Ross Cowan, The Art of the Etruscan Armourer
 Ross Cowan, An Important Italic Helmet

 
Military history of Italy
Military history of Europe